Elections were held in the Australian state of Queensland between 18 April 1893 and 25 May 1893 to elect the members of the state's Legislative Assembly.

Key dates
Due to problems of distance and communications, it was not possible to hold the elections on a single day.

Results

|}

See also
 Members of the Queensland Legislative Assembly, 1893–1896

References

Elections in Queensland
1893 elections in Australia
1890s in Queensland
April 1893 events
May 1893 events